Ramadevi Choudhury() (3 December 1899 – 22 July 1985), also known as Rama Devi, was an Indian freedom fighter and a social reformer. She was called Maa (Mother) by the people of Odisha. The Ramadevi Women's University in Bhubaneswar has been named after her.

Family
She was the daughter of Gopal Ballav Das and Basant Kumari Devi and the niece of Utkal Gaurab Madhusudan Das. At the age of 15, she married Gopabandhu Choudhury, then a Deputy Collector.

Role during Independence
Together with her husband, she joined the Indian independence movement in 1921. She was highly influenced by Mahatma Gandhi and took an active part in Non Cooperation Movement.  She used to go from village to village to encourage women to join the independence movement. Others who influenced her were Jai Prakash Narayan, Vinoba Bhave and her uncle, Madhusudan Das. In 1921, she had her first meeting with Gandhiji and, together with her husband, joined the Non Cooperation Movement. The same year they joined the Indian National Congress and started wearing khadi. In 1930, she took active part in the Salt Satyagraha movement at Orissa level. She went to Inchudi and Srijang, with other activist like Kiranbala Sen, Maltidevi, Sarala Devi, Pranakrushna Padhiari. She and her colleagues were arrested in November 1930 and placed in different jails by the British.  She was arrested several times (in 1921, 1930, 1936, 1942) with other women independence activists like Sarala Devi, Malati Choudhury and others and was sent to jail. She attended the 1931 Karachi session of the Indian National Congress and, at that time, requested leaders to hold the next session in Orissa. In 1932 after her release from Hazaribagh jail, she was actively involved in Harijan welfare. She stated the Asprushyata Nibarana Samiti under instructions from Gandhiji, for the eradication of untouchability. The institution was later renamed the Harijan Sewa Sangha. She was closely involved in Gandhiji's 1932 and 1934 visits to Orissa as well as the visits of, Kasturba, Sardar Patel, Rajendra Prasad, Maulana Azad, Jawaharlal Nehru and others. She started an Ashram at Bari, Orissa which Gandhiji named Sewaghar. During the Quit India Movement of 1942, members of Rama Devi's entire family, including her husband, Gopabandhu Choudhury, were arrested. After the death of Kasturba Gandhi, Gandhji assigned her work as the representative of the Orissa chapter of the Kasturba Trust.

Role after independence of India
After the Independence of India in 1947, Rama Devi dedicated herself to the cause of Bhoodan and Gramdan movement of Acharya Vinoba Bhave. In 1952 she along with her husband she travelled on foot about 4000 kilometres across the state to propagate the message of giving land and wealth to the landless and poor. From 1928, Rama Devi stayed in the Alaka Ashram at Jagatsingpur.

She helped set up the Utkal Khadi Mandal and also established a Teachers’ Training Centre and Balwadi at Ramchandrapur. In 1950 she set up a Tribal Welfare Centre at Dumburugeda. During the 1951 famine she and Malati worked in famine relief in Koraput. She worked to aid soldiers affected by the Indo-Chinese War of 1962.

During the Emergency she protested by bringing out her own newspaper along with Harekrushna Mahatab and Nilamani Routray. The Gram Sevak Press, was banned by the government and was arrested along with other leaders from Orissa like Nabakrushna Choudhuri, Harekrushna Mahatab, Manmohan Chowdhury, Smt. Annapurna Moharana, Jaykrushana Mohanty, and others.

She established a primary school, Shishu Vihar and a cancer hospital at Cuttack.

Honours
In recognition of her services to the nation, Ramadevi was awarded the Jamnalal Bajaj Award on 4 November 1981 and the Doctor of Philosophy (Honoris causa) by Utkal University on 16 April 1984.

Memorials
Rama Devi Women's University at Bhubaneshwar is named in her memory. It is the first women's university in eastern India, established as such since 2015. There is a museum dedicated to her within the university premises. The school – Shishu Vihar – started by her at Cuttack is now named Ramadevi Shishu Vihar.

Death
She died on 22 July 1985 at the age of 85.

References

External links
 Ma Rama Devi Biography at Rama Devi Women's college website.
 Rama Devi : An Epitome of Women Emancipation. Govt. of Orissa website
 Rama Devi : The New Light Among the Women Freedom Fighters of Modern Orissa. Orissa Review, August 2005

1889 births
1985 deaths
Indian independence activists from Odisha
Indian reformers
Indian women activists
People from Cuttack district
Indians imprisoned during the Emergency (India)
Prisoners and detainees of British India
Indian editors
Indian women's rights activists
Founders of Indian schools and colleges
Social workers
Indian National Congress politicians from Odisha
Women in Odisha politics
20th-century Indian politicians
Indian women editors
20th-century Indian educational theorists
Indian women educational theorists
20th-century Indian women scientists
20th-century Indian social scientists
19th-century Indian women
19th-century Indian people
Activists from Odisha
Odia-language writers
Women writers from Odisha
Recipients of the Odisha Sahitya Akademi Award
Women scientists from Odisha
20th-century Indian women politicians
Women Indian independence activists
Scholars from Odisha
Social workers from Odisha
Women educators from Odisha
Educators from Odisha
20th-century women educators
20th-century Indian women writers